Stig Larsson may refer to:

 Stig Larsson (author) (Stig Håkan Larsson; born 1955) literary author
 Stieg Larsson (Karl Stig-Erland Larsson; 1954–2004) author of the Millennium trilogy of crime novels and far-left activist
 Stig Larsson (ice hockey) (born 1947) of Djurgårdens IF and Sweden national team
 Stig Olav Larsen (born 1973) Norwegian footballer

See also
Stieg Larsson